Ujan-e Sharqi Rural District is in Tekmeh Dash District of Bostanabad County, East Azerbaijan province, Iran. At the census of 2006, its population was 8,595 in 1,791 households; there were 8,313 inhabitants in 2,239 households at the following census of 2011; and in the most recent census of 2016, the population of the rural district was 8,429 in 2,485 households. The largest of its 22 villages was Qareh Baba, with 3,085 people.

References 

Bostanabad County

Rural Districts of East Azerbaijan Province

Populated places in East Azerbaijan Province

Populated places in Bostanabad County